The 21st Vietnam Film Festival was held from November 23 to November 27, 2019 in Vũng Tàu City, Bà Rịa–Vũng Tàu province, Vietnam, with the slogan "Building a national, humane, creative and integrated Vietnamese film industry" (Vietnamese: "Xây dựng nền công nghiệp điện ảnh Việt Nam dân tộc, nhân văn, sáng tạo và hội nhập").

Event 
This is the first film festival held in Vũng Tàu city. The award system this year has not changed. Starting from the 20th Vietnam Film Festival, the organizers have emphasized the "cinematic" nature of this award by removing direct-to-video films from the award system. This film festival is completely a playground for all categories of cinema. The festival continues to have the Audience Choice Award for "Most Favorite Film" to attend the "Panorama Program" in addition to the traditional awards for outstanding individuals and cinematic works in 4 categories: Feature film; Documentary; Science film and Animated film.

In the end, 3 Golden Lotus award were given to films in categories: feature film, documentary film and animated film.

Participation 
According to the regulations of the 21st Vietnam Film Festival, films participating in the festival are those that are licensed to distribute films between September 11, 2017 and September 10, 2019, using the Vietnamese language, produced by Vietnamese film establishments or in cooperation with foreign organizations, individuals and without copyright disputes.

Films participating in the 21st Vietnam Film Festival must be films that have not yet participated in the National Television Festival. Remake films (based on foreign scripts/films) can register to attend all programs of the Festival. In case the film is selected for the "In Competition" section, the awards for individual directors, actors, cinematographers, painters, sound, music, except for films and screenplay writers will be considered.

The total number of films approved for the "In Competition" section this year is 74 films belonging to 4 film genres: 16 feature films, 29 documentaries, 9 science films, and 20 animated films. In addition, the section "Panorama Program" showcases 14 feature films and 16 documentaries.

Jury 
The jury panels of the 21st Vietnam Film Festival were announced on November 8.

Accordingly, the jury in the Feature Film category consists of 9 members:
Doctor Trần Luân Kim, Former President of Vietnam Cinema Association (Head)
Actress/producer Trương Ngọc Ánh
Screenwriter Hoàng Nhuận Cầm
Director Bùi Tuấn Dũng
Journalist Hữu Việt
Director Lê Thanh Sơn
Composer Trọng Đài
Painter Nguyễn Trung Phan
Cinematographer Nguyễn Nam

In the Documentary - Science category, the jury consists of 7 members:
Director Lê Hồng Chương (Head)
Journalist Trần Việt Văn
Journalist Đinh Trọng Tuấn
Director Vũ Hoài Nam
Screenwriter Nguyễn Thu Dung
Director/journalist Tô Hoàng
Director Nguyễn Tường Phương

The jury of the Animated category consists of 5 members:
Animator Nguyễn Thị Phương Hoa (Head)
Master Nguyễn Quang Trung
Composer Phạm Ngọc Khôi
Journalist Chu Thu Hằng
Animator Đỗ Lệnh Hùng Tú

Activities 
Film week to celebrate the 21st Vietnam Film Festival takes place from November 6 to 12, 2019 in Hanoi and Ho Chi Minh City. Film Week is chaired by the Cinema Department (Ministry of Culture, Sports and Tourism), in collaboration with the National Cinema Center and Dcine Joint Stock Company. The opening ceremony of Film Week will take place on the evening of November 6 at the National Cinema Center, 87 Láng Hạ street, Ba Đình district, which is also a movie screening venue of Hanoi. Audiences in Ho Chi Minh City can watch movies at Dcine Bến Thành Cinema, 06 Mạc Đĩnh Chi street, Bến Nghé Ward, District 1. Each film will be screened once a week. 2 invitations is maximum for an audience. Invitation to see the film has been sent by the Cinema Department to the movie screening locations.

From November 23, the Film Festival officially started with many activities to praise and introduce to the public Vietnamese cinematic works imbued with national identity, rich in humanity, with creative imprints; honoring film artists with outstanding artistic achievements. The schedule of activities of the festival is as follows:

November 23:
 Offering incense and visiting Martyrs' Monument in Vũng Tàu City, 7:30.
 Opening of the photo exhibition "Vietnam's seas and islands through a cinematic perspective" (Vietnamese: "Biển đảo Việt Nam qua góc nhìn điện ảnh"). It starts at 9:00 in the Revolutionary Traditional House, 01 Bacu Street, Vũng Tàu City).
Press conference before the opening of the Film Festival (10:30, at Pullman Vung Tau Hotel).
The opening ceremony of the 21st Vietnam Film Festival (20:00, at Pullman Vung Tau Hotel).

November 24:
 Seminar on "Film scene in Vietnam" (Vietnamese: "Bối cảnh quay phim tại Việt Nam"). It takes place at 9:00 in Pullman Hotel.
 Exchange of film artists with the audience and students (14:00, at the Provincial Youth Cultural House).

November 25:
 Seminar "Improving the quality of Vietnamese cinema in international integration" (Vietnamese: "Nâng cao chất lượng điện ảnh Việt Nam trong hội nhập quốc tế"). It takes place at 9:00 in Pullman Hotel.
 Exchange of film artists with soldiers of the armed forces (14:00, at the Provincial Youth Cultural House).

November 26:
 Program to visit the scenic spots of Bà Rịa–Vũng Tàu province (from 8:00 to 16:00).
 Rehearsal of Closing and Awards Ceremony (18:00, at Pullman Vung Tau Hotel).

November 27:
 Closing and awarding ceremony of the 21st Vietnam Film Festival (20:00, at Pullman Vung Tau hotel).

During the festival, the cinematographic works of the contest will be screened for free for the audience at cinemas: Lotte Cinema Vũng Tàu (Lotte Mart supermarket, 3/2 street, Vũng Tàu City), CGV Lam Sơn Square (09, Le Lợi street, Vũng Tàu City), CGV Lapen Center (30A, 30/4 street, Vũng Tàu City) and Bà Rịa Cinema (320, Cách Mạng Tháng Tám street, Bà Rịa City). Audiences can come to the above cinemas to receive free movie tickets.

The opening and closing ceremonies were broadcast live on channels: Culture and Tourism TV channel (Vietnam Journey), VTC1, VTC9 and VOV3.

Official Selection

Feature film

In Competition 

Highlighted title indicates Golden Lotus winner.

Panorama Program 

Highlighted title indicates the most favorite film voted by the audience.

Awards

Feature film

Documentary/Science film

Documentary film

Science film

Animated film

References 

Vietnam Film Festival
Vietnam Film Festival
Vietnam Film Festival
2019 in Vietnam
November 2019 events in Vietnam